Kandal is a province of Cambodia located in the southeast portion of the country. It completely surrounds the Cambodian capital of Phnom Penh and borders the provinces of Kampong Speu and Takéo to the west, Kampong Chhnang and Kampong Cham to the north, Prey Veng to the east, and shares an international border with Vietnam (An Giang and Đồng Tháp) to the south. It is the second most populous province in Cambodia after the capital Phnom Penh. Kandal is one of the wealthier provinces in the country.

Geography

Physical
Kandal province completely surrounds the capital Phnom Penh. The province is also a part of the greater Phnom Penh Metropolitan Area with more than a million people living in and around the province. While traveling out of Phnom Penh, the boundary between the two provinces is nearly unrecognizable.

The province consists of the typical plain wet area, covering rice fields and other agricultural plantations. The average altitude of the province is no more than 10 meters above sea level. The province also features two of the biggest rivers in the country, the Bassac and Mekong Rivers.

Climate
The province has a warm and humid tropical climate. The monsoon season normally begins in May and runs through October, while the rest of the year is the dry season. The warmest period of the year occurs between March and May, while the coolest period is from November through March.

Economy

Kandal province serves as an economic belt of the capital Phnom Penh. Farming and fishing are the two main industries of the province. Major products include palm oil, peanuts, rice, and pepper. In addition to farming and fishing, the province also supports thriving cottage industries that specialize in wood carving, silk, and handicrafts.

Many garment factories are located in Kandal province, which hires more than 500,000 workers.

Administrative divisions

The province is subdivided into 10 districts and 1 municipality. The districts are further subdivided into 146 communes (khum) and 1087 villages.

2 districts Khsach Kandal and Lvea Aem in east Mekong river

Parliament

References

 
Provinces of Cambodia